Capital League 4 is the fifth tier of men's senior football (soccer) in Brisbane, Queensland and Level 8 within the Australian soccer league system. It is administered by Football Brisbane. All clubs participating in Capital League 4 must field two teams, one in first grade, and another in the reserves competition. Clubs in the NPL and Brisbane Premier League cannot field their reserves teams in this division. This division was the lowest in the Football Brisbane structure in 2017, was not required in 2018 following a restructure of Queensland football which resulted in many Football Brisbane clubs joining the newly formed Football Queensland Premier League.

History
The 1949 Brisbane soccer season was the first in which the number of entries required the formation of a fifth division. The seven teams competing in 1949 Division 5 including the first teams of RAAF Amberley, Redland Bay, Annerley and Postal Institute, the latter two in their first season of senior soccer. Reserves teams of Bardon, Mitchelton and Junction Rangers made up the seven teams. The 1949 Division 5 champions were RAAF Amberley after defeating Redland Bay 4-2 in a play-off match.

The fifth tier of Brisbane soccer continued to be known as Division 5 from 1949 to 1982. Reserve teams from higher division teams have continued to participate alongside first grade teams of other clubs since 1978 but with less frequency than earlier years. When the Brisbane Premier League was formed in 1983, the Tier 5 league became Division 4. An intermediate league existed at Tier 2 between 1984 and 1986 and the fifth tier became Amateur Division 3. From 1987 to 1996, Tier 5 was again known as Division 5 before reverting to Amateur Division 3 again between 1997 and 2001, then Division 4 for the 2002 season.

From 2003 to 2012, the fifth tier of Brisbane football was known as Metro League Division Two, which operated directly below Metro League Division One. The league was composed of a mix of first grade teams, and reserve teams from clubs in the three premier divisions, and was consistently made up of 12 clubs from 2005 to 2012.

Since being renamed Capital League 4 in 2013, the division has had an irregular number of clubs in its composition, varying from a low of 7 clubs completing the 2014 season to a high of 13 clubs in 2016.  The 2017 Capital League 4 season commenced with 9 clubs participating.  Due to a restructure of Queensland football in 2018 which included many Football Brisbane clubs joining the newly formed Football Queensland Premier League there were not enough clubs to form a division at the Capital League 4 level in 2018.

Format
The regular season consists of 22 rounds with teams playing each other twice in a home and away format.

Following the regular season the top four teams on the table play in a finals series using the following format:
 First Week: Semi Final 1 – 3rd vs 4th; Semi Final 2 – 1st vs 2nd
 Second Week: Preliminary Final – Loser Semi 2 vs Winner Semi 1
 Final Week: Grand Final – Winner Semi 2 vs Winner Preliminary.

Promotion/relegation
At the end of the regular season the top two teams are promoted to Capital League 3. There is no relegation. There is a finals series at the end of the regular season.

Clubs
The clubs for the 2017 season are shown in the table below:

References

External links
 Football Brisbane
 SportsTG Fixtures & Results

Soccer leagues in Queensland